Orgosolo is a comune (municipality) located in the Province of Nuoro, in the autonomous region of Sardinia, at about  north of Cagliari and about  south of Nuoro. 
The municipality is famous for its murals. These political paintings can be found on walls all over Orgosolo. Since about 1969, the murals reflect different aspects of Sardinia's political struggles but also deal with international issues.
 
Vittorio De Seta's movie Banditi a Orgosolo (1961) focuses on the past way of life in central Sardinia and on the phenomenon of "Banditry" in the region. At one time Orgosolo was known as the "village of the murderers" due to its high crime rate. Bandits of the surrounding mountains used the church door to post notices of death sentence passed on their enemies.

References

External links

 Official website 
 Street art Sardinia: the myth and magic of Orgosolo's murals, The Guardian

Cities and towns in Sardinia